Pennalurpet (Tamil: Velamakandriga is a village in India located on the Andhra Pradesh and Tamil Nadu border. The village is under the control of Tamil Nadu government. Farming is the main income source for this village.

Geography
Pennalurpet is in the Thiruvallur district of Uthukottai Taluk, 24 km from the town of Thiruvallur and 12 km from Poondi. It is near a forest surrounded by several mountains and in the vicinity of the forest temple known as Mannachi Amman Caves Temple.

History
The history of Pennalurpet and Velamakandriga goes to the days of British colonial rule. It was governed by Velamas who paid tribute to kings to retain the control. These Velamas (zamindars) still live in the village. B. Venkataramana (Pondi Union Chairman) is the descendant of the zamindar family,
The family has donated their property for public use, the school, for village hospitals, and also for the welfare of the people.

Pennalurpet police station, which was established in 1908, was the first police station in the Thiruvallur district. This station controls until the west Thirupathi border and the East Madras border.

Demographics
In the 2001 Indian census, Pennalurpet had a population of 3,567, with 1,733 males and 1,834 females.

In the 2011 census, Pennalurpet reported 5,466 inhabitants.

More than 15 communities of people live in the village.

Language
Tamil and Telugu are the major languages. Since the village is located near Andhra Pradesh, most people know both languages.

Temple
A Hanuman temple was located in Velemakandigai (1 km from Pennalurpet) which is several years old and believed to be Suyambu Moorthy. There is also a temple tank dedicated to this temple which has pure water with medical value.

Every year in the last week of May (Hanuman Jayanthi) the people from Velamakandriga host the annual festival for the gracious temple lord. During this period poojas and special annadhanams in the afternoon (for more than 1500 people) are performed daily for ten days and the seventh day is considered special because on the fire festival which decorates the evening.

Towards west side is the Nagathamman temple, north side is the Santhavalliyamman temple, south side is the Palayathamman temple, and east side is the Lord Siva Temple in Thamaraikulam.

Notes

Villages in Tiruvallur district